Payroll is a 1961 British neo-noir crime thriller film directed by Sidney Hayers and starring Michael Craig, Françoise Prévost and Billie Whitelaw. It was based by screenwriter George Baxt on the 1959 novel of the same title by Derek Bickerton. The story is about a gang of villains who stage a wages robbery that goes disastrously wrong.

Plot
Four crooks (Johnny Mellors, Monty, Blackie and Bert) plan and execute a robbery on a payroll van, using the inside knowledge of Dennis Pearson, who works as an accountant at the firm concerned. Pearson is under pressure to support his wife Katie (Françoise Prévost), who demands a higher standard of living. However, the van driver, Harry Parker, is killed during the heist, while Bert is fatally wounded by Parker's colleague Frank Moore. Nevertheless, the gang manages to get away with £50,000.

Having found out that Pearson was the 'inside man', Parker's widow Jackie (Billie Whitelaw) starts posting threatening letters to him. Katie in the meantime has become involved with Johnny, hoping to get some of the money for herself. As the gang members start to argue amongst themselves, they are pursued by both Katie and Jackie. The climax takes place in Norfolk, with Johnny and Katie double-crossing each other and Jackie tracking Johnny in her bid for revenge.

Cast

 Michael Craig as Johnny Mellors 
 Françoise Prévost as Katie Pearson 
 Billie Whitelaw as Jackie Parker 
 William Lucas as Dennis Pearson 
 Kenneth Griffith as Monty Dunston
 Tom Bell as Blackie 
 Barry Keegan as Bert Langridge 
 Edward Cast as Detective Sergeant Bradden 
 Andrew Faulds as Detective Inspector Carberry 
 William Peacock as Harry Parker 
 Glyn Houston as Frank Moore 
 Joan Rice as Madge Moore 
 Vanda Godsell as Doll
 Stanley Meadows as Bowen
 Brian McDermott as Brent 
 Hugh Morton as Mr John 
 Keith Faulkner as Alf
 Bruce Beeby as Worth 
 Murray Evans as Billy 
 Kevin Bennett as Archie Murdock 
 Mary Laura Wood as Mrs Murdock 
 Pauline Shepherd as Secretary 
 Paddy Edwards as Beryl
 Meadows White as Strange
 Michael Barrington as Hay
 Anthony Bate as Detective (uncredited)
 Anita Sharp-Bolster as Landlady (uncredited)

Production
The film's working title was I Promise to Pay. Much of it was shot on location in and around Gateshead and Newcastle upon Tyne, an unusual procedure at the time. Other scenes were shot in Whitley Bay, Rugby and Southwold; after location work was complete, the film began studio shooting at Beaconsfield Studios on 10 October 1960.

Michael Craig was loaned from Rank. Of Hayers he said "I think he'd learned 'directing' from a manual".

Release
The film opened at the Plaza cinema in London's West End on 20 April 1961, and went into general release in the UK on 21 May 1961.

Theme music
The theme music, by Reg Owen and His Orchestra, was issued as a single on the Palette label (PG.9013).

The song "It Happens Every Day", sung in a nightclub scene in the film by Eddie Ellis, was composed by Tony Osborne and Norman Newell, and released as a single on the Parlophone label (R. 4749).

References

External links
 

1961 films
British crime thriller films
Films set in Newcastle upon Tyne
Films shot in Northumberland
Films set in Norfolk
Films shot in Suffolk
1960s crime thriller films
British heist films
Films directed by Sidney Hayers
Payroll
Films based on British novels
1960s English-language films
1960s British films
Films shot at Beaconsfield Studios